Ithaca is the fifth studio album by American singer/songwriter Paula Cole. This was released internationally on 21 September 2010 on Decca Records. It was tracked between February until the end of April 2010.

It is the first album entirely written by Cole (apart from "Somethin' I've Gotta Say" which was co-written with Kevin Barry) since 1999's Amen. The album was produced by Paula Cole and Chris Roberts. Kevin Killen (who produced Cole's debut record Harbinger) co-produced.

“The overall theme of Ithaca is the return to home and making peace with it,” Cole says. “It's about accepting that I actually want to be with a man who is a lot like my father and that I am a lot like my mother—which I’ve written about in ‘Music In Me.’ I rebelled against these classical complexes and got really beat up in the world. So I’ve come to a quiet place of acceptance in my family and my hometown. That's why I called the album ‘Ithaca,’ which is the island Odysseus came home to in The Odyssey after 10 years of fighting and 10 years of trying to get back home. Rockport is my Ithaca, and coming home has been an Odyssean journey: enduring war and finding beautiful things in home. That's the tone of the album, that there is both darkness and light to this story. My journey has healed me, and in that healing process I’ve been able to work again.”

Background
Following the commercial disappointment of her 1999 album Amen, Cole parted ways with Warner Bros. Records disillusioned by the music industry and the pressure from label executives to sell records. Without a record deal, Cole decided to take time off and focus on raising her young daughter Sky. “I needed to get off the giant hamster wheel,” Cole says of her music career. “I wanted to find some other meaning to my life and it seemed impossible to combine motherhood with the music business. It was like being at a spiritual stop sign in the road. That's what inspired ‘Somethin’ I’ve Gotta Say,’ one of the older songs on the album. I thought I was done with the music career after having Sky.”

Several years later, Cole was lured back to record-making by a friend, Blood, Sweat & Tears’ drummer Bobby Colomby, who produced her intimate, jazz-influenced collection Courage, which she released in 2007 while going through a difficult divorce. After the split was finalised in 2008, Cole moved back to her hometown of Rockport, Massachusetts to write what became Ithaca.

Critical reception

Allmusic praised Ithaca's emotionally raw, '90s sound, stating that it allowed Cole to work out her troubles while becoming reacquainted with the listener, taking them on a journey of pain and her ultimate rebirth. The album has consistently been compared to Cole's Harbinger and This Fire records.

Promotion
In support of Ithaca, Cole embarked on a small promotion tour which took her across the United States throughout October, November and December 2010.

Track listing

Personnel
Paula Cole – vocals, piano, Wurlitzer, rhodes, clarinet
Ben Wittman – drums, programming
Ben Bulter – electric guitar, acoustic guitar,
Jon Ossman – bass guitar, sitar, esraj, acoustic bass guitar, backing vocalist
Tony Levin – Chapman stick, upright bass
Kevin Barry – acoustic and electric guitars, lap steel guitar, electric ambiance
Marc Ribot – banjo, electric guitar
Jeremy Lubbock – string quartet arrangement
Lisa Kim – violin
Sharon Yamada – violin
Rebecca Young – viola
Maria Kitsopolous – cello
Evan Barker – copyist
Sandy Park – contractor

Production
Produced by Paula Cole and Chris Roberts
Co-produced by Kevin Killen
Engineered and mixed by Kevin Killen
Additional engineering by Ben Wittman
Mastered by Bob Ludwig, Gateway Mastering

Design
A&R Administration by Evelyn Morgan and Amy Merxbauer
A&R Coordination by Paul Altomari
Creative Direction by Pat Barry
Package Design by Denise Trotman
Photography by Fabrizio Ferri
Package Coordination by Tom Arndt
Styling by Sarah Gore
Hair by Rodney Groves
Makeup by Kristen Gallegos

References

2010 albums
Paula Cole albums
Decca Records albums
Albums produced by Kevin Killen